M. robusta  may refer to:
 Marsdenia robusta, synonym of Dregea arabica, a plant species endemic to Socotra and mainland Yemen
 Metrosideros robusta, the Northern rata, a huge forest tree endemic to New Zealand
 Mogera robusta, the large mole, a mammal species found in China, North Korea, South Korea and Russia
 Moroteuthis robusta, the robust clubhook squid, a squid species found primarily in the boreal to temperate North Pacific
 Muraena robusta, the Stout moray, a moray eel species found in the eastern and central Atlantic Ocean
 Myristica robusta, a plant species endemic to Indonesia
 Mystacina robusta, the New Zealand greater short-tailed bat, a bat species unique to New Zealand

See also
 Robusta (disambiguation)